The Geneva Amateur Operatic Society (GAOS, Geneva Musical Theatre) is an English-speaking musical theatre and light opera group. Based in Geneva, GAOS was founded in 1971 by a small group of theatre enthusiasts. They produce three productions per season, including their traditional English pantomime in the winter. GAOS is a nonprofit organization, its members receive no payment and the society makes a point of giving a substantial donations to various charities around Geneva.

Productions 
 1971 Trial by Jury (concert version)
 1972 The Mikado, The Beggar's Opera, Jack and the Beanstalk (panto)
 1973 The Pirates of Penzance, Puss in Boots (panto)
 1974 Ruddigore, Aladdin (panto), Babes in the Wood (panto)
 1975 Iolanthe, Dick Whittington (panto)
 1976 The Gondoliers, A Soirée at the Salle, Cinderella (panto)
 1977 Bluebeard, Old Time Music Hall, Mother Goose (panto)
 1978 The Boy Friend, Old Time Music Hall, Ali Baba (panto)
 1979 H.M.S. Pinafore, Old Time Music Hall, Goldilocks and the Three Bears (panto)
 1980 Brigadoon, Music Hall Revue, Sleeping Beauty (panto)
 1981 Princess Ida, Old Time Music Hall, Little Red Riding Hood (panto)
 1982 The Vagabond King, Old Time Music Hall, The Frog Prince (panto)
 1983 The Yeomen of the Guard, Old Time Music Hall, Snow White and the Seven Dwarfs (panto)
 1984 Orpheus in the Underworld, Old Time Music Hall, Sinbad the Sailor (panto)
 1985 The White Horse Inn, 10th Old Time Music Hall, Pinocchio (panto)
 1986 The Merry Widow, Music Hall, Little Miss Muffet (panto)
 1987 The Pirates of Penzance (excerpts), Oklahoma!, Old Time Music Hall, Aladdin (panto)
 1988 Die Fledermaus, Old Time Music Hall, Peter Pan (panto)
 1989 The Music Man, Old Time Music Hall, My Fair Lady (excerpts), King Arthur (panto)
 1990 My Fair Lady, Old Time Music Hall, Travelin', Humpty Dumpty (panto)
 1991 The Mikado, Old Time Music Hall, The Andrew Lloyd Webber Story, The Ice Maiden (panto)
 1992 Salad Days, Old Time Music Hall, Jack and the Beanstalk (panto)
 1993 The Gypsy Baron, Old Time Music Hall, Carousel (excerpts), Puss-in-Boots (panto)
 1994 West Side Story, Summer Follies, Robinson Crusoe (panto)
 1995 Fiddler on the Roof, Old Time Music Hall, Santa in Space (panto)
 1996 La Périchole, Another Summer Folly, La Périchole at Waterford Festival of Light Opera, Cinderella (panto)
 1997 Anything Goes, The Wind in the Willows
 1998 The Pirates of Penzance, Cruising, The Wizard of Oz
 1999 Carousel, Old Time Music Hall, Babes in the Wood (panto)
 2000 Guys and Dolls, Thank You for the Music, Beauty and the Beast (panto)
 2001 The Gondoliers, A Funny Thing Happened on the Way to the Forum, A Slice of Saturday Night, A Christmas Carol
 2002 Me and My Girl, Showtime, Dick Whittington (panto)
 2003 High Society, A Slice of Saturday Night, The Water Nymph (panto)
 2004 Oliver!, Joseph and the Amazing Technicolor Dreamcoat, Sleeping Beauty (panto)
 2005 Iolanthe, Old Time Musical, Grease, Alice in Wonderland (panto)
 2006 Hello Dolly!, To Hell With Opera, Annie, Ali Baba (panto)
 2007 Follies, Up The Empire!, Fiddler on the Roof, Snow White (panto)
 2008 Kiss Me, Kate, Guys and Dolls, Aladdin (panto)
 2009 Chess, Thoroughly Modern Millie, Red Riding Hood (panto)
 2010 The Sound of Music, Beauty and The Beast Jr., Cinderella (panto)
 2011 The Producers, Mulan Jr., Jack and The Beanstalk (panto)
 2012 HMS Pinafore, From Flappers To Rappers, Oklahoma!, Sinbad the Sailor (panto)
 2013 Chicago, West Side Story, Goldilocks and the Three Bears (panto)
 2014 Cats, Hairspray, Once Upon a Time (panto)
 2015 Cabaret, The Addams Family, Sinbad (panto), Rumpelstiltskin (panto)
 2016 Chitty Chitty Bang Bang, Hair, Puss in Boots (panto)
 2017 Lets Face the Music, Legally Blonde, The Wizard of Oz
 2018 South Pacific, The Best of Broadway, The Little Mermaid (panto)
 2019 Into the Woods, Grease, The Wind in the Willows
 2020 Robin Hood (online panto)
 2021 Little Shop of Horrors, Cinderella (panto)
 2022 For the Boys, A Night at the Musicals, Sleeping Beauty (panto)

References 

Arts organizations established in 1971
Organisations based in Geneva
Culture in Geneva
English-language mass media
Swiss opera companies
Musical groups established in 1971